Ethmia alba is a moth in the family Depressariidae. It is found in Egypt, Iran and the United Arab Emirates.

References

Moths described in 1949
alba